Hanneke Niens (The Hague, 10 October 1965) is a Dutch television and film producer. She is founder and owner of the production company KeyFilm (2008 - present) and before founder and producer of IDTV Film (2000 - 2008). She is incidentally guest tutor at the Netherlands Film Academy and the international audiovisual organization EAVE. 

During her career Hanneke Niens won numerous awards both as producer and with her companies. Notable awards are the Golden Calf Best long feature film for De Tweeling (Twin sisters) (2003), an Academy Award nomination Best foreign language film for De Tweeling (2004) and the Prix Europa Television Programme of the Year for the telemovie De uitverkorene (The Chosen One) (2006). In 2007 Pierre Bokma won an International Emmy Award for his role in this movie. Box office hits Soof, Soof 2 and Soof 3 were all awarded the Platinum Film. In 2018 her international co-production The Reports on Sarah and Saleem won the Special Jury Award for Best Scenario and the HBF Audience Award on the International Film Festival Rotterdam.
Her films have been selected for the international A-festivals Hot Docs, IDFA, Berlinale, San Sebastián, Toronto, Venice and Rotterdam.
 Hanneke is member of the European Producers Club, European Film Academy and member of the supervisory board of the International Film Festival Rotterdam. From 2004 to 2010, she was board member of Film Producers Netherlands.

Selected filmography

Feature films
 Family (2001)
 Baby (2002)
 Twin Sisters (De Tweeling) (2002)
 Godforsaken (2003)
 Cloaca (2003)
 Life! (2005)
 A Thousand Kisses (2006)
 Unfinished Sky (2007)
 Bride Flight (2008)
 Bollywood Hero (2009)
 The Dark House (2009)
 Heading West (2010)
 Silent City (2012)
 Soof (2013)
 Nena (2014)
 Ventoux (2015)
 Ya tayr el tayer (The Idol) (2015)
 Beyond Sleep (2016)
 Camp Holland (2016)
 Night of a 1000 Hours (2016)
 Soof 2 (2016)
 Craving (2017)
 The Reports on Sarah and Saleem (2018)
 The Beast in the Jungle (2019)
 So What Is Love (2019)
 Tench (2020)
The Warden (2020)
Huda's Salon (2021)
Soof 3 (2022)
Queens (2022)
A House in Jerusalem (2023)

Television
 Oud Geld (1998-1999)
 Zinloos (2004)
 Eilandgasten (2005)
 On Stage (2005)
 Escort (2006)
 The Chosen One (2006)
 De avondboot (2007)
 De fuik (2008)
 Hou Holland schoon (2008)
 Den Helder (2008)
 Dag in dag uit (2008)
 Maite was here (2009)
 De Ander (2009)
 Zara (2009)
 Memory Lane (2010)
 Val (2010)
 Diamond Dancers (2010)
 Hyperscape (2010)
 Verre vrienden (2010)
 Flysk (2010)
 Coup de Grâce (2011)
 One False Move (2011)
 Over (2012)
 Uit (2012)
 Bowy is binnen (2012)
 Exit (2013)
 Greifensee (2013)
 Voices of Finance (2015)
 Soof: een nieuw begin (two seasons, 2017–2018)
Swanenburg (2021)

Documentaries
 Great Lengths (2010)
 This is my picture when I was dead (2010)
 What the cat sees (2011)
 Nadia's tics (2011)
 De man met 100 kinderen (2012)
 Niets blijft (2012)
 Gitaarjongens (2013)
 Refugees: Who Needs Them? (2013)
 My Genius Brother Harry (2013)
 Paradijsbestormers (2014)
 Herinnering aan een trieste dageraad (2014)
 Becoming Zlatan (2015)
 Mies gaat naar Hollywood (2016)
 De mooiste marathon (2016)
 Ik ben Alice (2015)
 Erbarme dich (2015)

References

External links
 
 KeyFilm Feature films
 KeyFilm Television
 KeyFilm/Documentaires

1965 births
Living people
Dutch film producers
Dutch women film producers
Dutch television producers
Dutch women television producers